The Lamborghini Calà (also known as the Italdesign Calà) was a concept car designed for Lamborghini by Italdesign Giugiaro. It was first shown at the 1995 Geneva Motor Show. It was a completely functional prototype that never made it into production. Its name was derived from the Piedmontese dialect of Northern Italy and meant “look, over there!” 

The Calà was envisioned by Italdesign to fill Lamborghini's need for a replacement for the Jalpa, production of which was discontinued in 1988 at the behest of then owners of the company, Chrysler. When Chrysler sold Lamborghini to Megatech in 1994, the Calà's design took shape, but when Megatech sold Lamborghini to the Volkswagen Group in 1998, the concept was shelved. Fifteen years after the end of its production, the Jalpa would finally be replaced in 2003 by the Gallardo which used the principles of the Calà as an inspiration.

Design and specifications

It was mated to a 6-speed manual transmission that drove the rear wheels, with an aluminium chassis and a hand-built carbon fibre body. It borrowed elements from some of Lamborghini's iconic production vehicles, such as the headlights of the Miura and the widescreen of the Countach. The Calà was built on the previous Gandini-styled P140 prototype.

Other media
The car is featured on the cover and in the 1997 video game Need for Speed II.

References

External links 

 Italdesign Giugiaro: Lamborghini Calà
 ConceptCarz: Lamborghini Calà

Cala
Italdesign concept vehicles
Sports cars